Fruitvale, California may refer to:
 Fruitvale, Fresno County, California
 Fruitvale, Kern County, California
 Fruitvale, Oakland, California